A crop, sometimes called a riding crop or hunting crop, is a short type of whip without a lash, used in horse riding, part of the family of tools known as horse whips.

Types and uses
A modern crop usually consists of a long shaft of fiberglass or cane which is covered in leather, fabric, or similar material. The rod of a crop thickens at one end to form a handle, and terminates in a thin, flexible tress such as wound cord or a leather tongue, known as a keeper. The thin end is intended to make contact with the horse, whilst the keeper prevents the horse's skin from being marked. The handle may have a loop of leather to help secure the grip or a "mushroom" on the end to prevent it from slipping through the rider's hand.

The length of a crop is designed to allow enough leverage for it to be accelerated rapidly with a controlled flick of the wrist, without causing the rider balancing problems. Thus, a true crop is relatively short.

The term "whip" is a more common term that includes both riding crops as well as longer types of horse whips used for both riding and ground work. A whip is a little slower than a crop, mostly due to having slightly greater length and flexibility.

In equestrianism
Crops are principally designed to back up the natural aids (leg, seat and voice) of a rider.
The crop should not be used as punishment, where the animal fails to perform a wanted behaviour and as such is hit. Positive Punishment (+P) is the term used for the adding of an unpleasant stimulus for the performance or non performance of a behaviour. Not only has it been shown to be unsuccessful in training the horse, it also has serious implications for animal welfare, and the development of learned helplessness. 

Hunting whips are not for use on the horse, but have a "hook" at the end to use in opening and shutting gates without dismounting, as well as a long leather thong to keep the hounds from coming near the horse's legs, and possibly getting kicked.

Other uses

Weapon
Crops can be carried as a weapon. In the Sherlock Holmes series of novels and short stories, Holmes is occasionally said to carry one as his favourite weapon (e.g., "The Adventure of the Six Napoleons").  Specifically, it is a loaded hunting crop.  Such crops were sold at one time.  Loading refers to the practice of filling the shaft and head with a heavy metal (e.g., steel, lead) to provide some heft.

BDSM
Crops are sometimes used in BDSM as part of impact play. Art deco sculptor Bruno Zach produced perhaps his best known sculpture—called "The Riding Crop" (c. 1925)—which features a scantily clad dominatrix wielding a crop.

See also
Quirt
Whip

References

Whips
Horse tack and equipment
BDSM equipment